Henri, marquis de Saint-Nectaire (born 1667; died 1 April 1746) was a French nobleman, soldier and diplomat.

The Marquis de Saint-Nectaire was commissioned in the Senneterre Dragoons, advancing to the rank of Brigadier in 1704 and Maréchal de camp later the same year. He was promoted Lieutenant-General of the French Army in 1718, before being posted to London by King Louis XV, where he served as Ambassador to Great Britain until 1720; he was appointed Chevalier du Saint-Esprit in 1724.

Family
His father, Jean-Charles de Saint-Nectaire (1608-1696), styled comte de Brinon (who was the third son of Jacques de Saint-Nectaire, baron de La Grolière), married in 1654 Marguérite (died 1701), sole heiress of Timoléon de Boves, baron de Contenant; of their five children, two survived childhood: Henri, who inherited his father's ancestral titles and his sister Madeleine, who married Pierre-Gilbert Colbert, marquis de Villacerf.

Upon his death in 1746, he was succeeded by his cousin, Jean-Charles, as marquis de Saint-Nectaire.

See also
 List of Ambassadors of France to Great Britain
 Château de La Ferté-Saint-Aubin (fr)
 House of Saint Nectaire (fr)

Notes

1667 births
1746 deaths
People from Charente-Maritime
French generals
French marquesses
French diplomats
18th-century French diplomats